The Batcave was a weekly club-night launched at 69 Dean Street in central London in 1982. It is considered to be the birthplace of the Southern English goth subculture. It lent its name to the term Batcaver, used to describe fans of the original gothic rock music, who would adorn themselves in Batwing coffin necklaces to distinguish themselves from other goth clubs.

The original Batcave ran for five months every Wednesday from 21 July 1982 at the Gargoyle Club in Soho, moving out when the upper floors were sold off that December. Originally specialising in new wave and glam rock, it later focused on gothic rock. Olli Wisdom, the lead singer in the house band Specimen, ran the night with Specimen's guitarist Jon Klein as art director, and initially with the assistance of production manager Hugh Jones. Famous regulars at the Batcave who came for meeting friends and having a drink, included musicians and singers  such as Nick Cave, Robert Smith of the Cure, Siouxsie Sioux, Steven Severin, the members of Bauhaus, Marc Almond and the members of Foetus. The novelist Rupert Thomson included an account of a Batcave club night in his 2010 memoir This Party's Got to Stop.

An array of bands would play live, alongside 4-hour sets from their resident DJ Hamish MacDonald, and when the club-night transferred to the former Subway club at 28 Leicester Square in February 1983, a guest DJ presided upstairs with a US Army jeep parked by the bar. (The Batcave decamped later that year to Fooberts and in 1984 to Gossip's, both in Soho). The bands involved included electronic leading act Alien Sex Fiend, the host's band Specimen who took influence from 1970s glam rock, Hamish's band Sexbeat, and Sex Gang Children, who would go on to prove influential in the gothic rock, dark cabaret and deathrock movements. At the Gargoyle, the Batcave also showed 8mm films in its old theatre and occasionally featured unusual cabaret such as Mr Swing the Fakir and mud-wrestling. Olli Wisdom told The Face: “We don’t suck our cheeks, we have fun.” In an interview for Mick Mercer's Gothic Rock, Jonny (Slut) Melton said of the Batcave: "It was a light bulb for all the freaks and people like myself who were from the sticks and wanted a bit more from life. Freaks, weirdos, sexual deviants ... There's people around who'll always be attracted by something shiny, glittering, exciting. At the time the Batcave wasn't a doomy, Gothy, droney grungey sort of place ... It was more Gotham City than Aleister Crowley."

As the terms "new punks" and "goth" became interchangeable, much of the image and fashion adopted by the subculture can be traced back to the bands that played at the Batcave. In 1983, a vinyl record entitled The Batcave: Young Limbs And Numb Hymns was released on the London Records label.  The compilation included Specimen ("Dead Mans Autochop"), Sexbeat ("Sexbeat"), Test Dept. ("Shockwork"), Patti Palladin ("The Nuns New Clothes"), James T. Pursey ("Eyes Shine Killidiscope"), Meat of Youth ("Meat of Youth"), Brilliant ("Coming Up for the Downstroke"), Alien Sex Fiend ("R.I.P."), and The Venomettes ("The Dance of Death"). The inside notes:  "Look past the slow black rain of a chill night in Soho; Ignore the lures of a thousand neon fire-flies, fall deft to the sighs of street corner sirens — come walk with me between heaven and hell. Here there is a club lost in its own feverish limbo, where sin becomes salvation and only the dark angels tread. For here is a BATCAVE. This screaming legend of blasphemy, Lechery, and Blood persists in the face of adversity.  For some the Batcave has become an icon, but for those that know it is an iconoclast, it is the avenging spirit of nightlife's badlands — its shadow looms large over London's demi-Monde: It is a challenge to the false Idol. It Will Endure."

In terms of contemporary club culture, the Batcave has to be seen as the root of indie dance music. Its two rules: 'No Funk, No Disco' set it apart from the norm of club music in the early-80s. It was the first club specifically geared to provide a dance floor for punk, rock, rockabilly, glam, reggae, garage and psychedelia. Within months, the DJ setlist was being quoted in The Face and Sounds, and the club began setting a soundtrack for the mid-1980s.

In 2008, Specimen played live at a 25th Anniversary Batcave party hosted by Club Antichrist in London. The show was recorded as a live album, Specimen Alive at the Batcave and released on Eyeswideshut/Metropolis Records. In 2009, Specimen's Jonny Slut and Jon Klein appeared at New York's Fashion Institute of Technology following the exhibition 'Gothic Dark Glamour', which featured Jon Klein's 1983 'Pigeon Shit' DIY stage outfit alongside high fashion designers such as Christian Dior and Alexander McQueen. The Fashion Symposium acknowledged the Batcave as a major influence on prevailing high fashion.

References

External links
 "A short 8 minute tv report from Reporting London, by London Weekend Television, from 1983"
 Youtube: A Danish TV documentary about the Batcave club in London and the band Specimen, 1984

Former buildings and structures in the City of Westminster
Nightclubs in London
Goth venues
Goth subculture
New wave music
Music venues completed in 1982
Former music venues in London
1982 establishments in England
Soho, London
Club nights